York City Football Club is a professional association football club based in York, North Yorkshire, England. Formed in May 1922, the club failed to be elected to the Football League for the 1922–23 season, but succeeded in gaining admission to the Midland League. After seven seasons of competing in the Midland League, the club was elected to play in the Football League ahead of 1929–30. After 75 years of Football League membership, York were relegated to the Football Conference in 2004. This is where the club remained for eight years before promotion back to the Football League was achieved with victory in the 2012 Conference Premier play-off Final. However, York were relegated to the National League four years later.

The club's first team have competed in numerous competitions, and all players who have played between 25 and 99 first-team matches, either as a member of the starting eleven or as a substitute, are listed below. Each player's details include the duration of his York career, his typical playing position while with the club, and the number of matches played and goals scored in domestic league matches and in all senior competitive matches. Where applicable, the list also includes the national team for which the player was selected, and the number of senior international caps he won.

Introduction
As of the date specified above, more than 300 players had completed their York career after playing in at least 25 and fewer than 100 senior competitive matches. Four of these, Tom Lockie, Barry Lyons, Denis Smith and Neil Thompson, went on to manage the club. Lockie led the team to the League Cup quarter-final in the 1961–62 season and promotion from the Fourth Division in 1964–65, while Smith guided York to the Fourth Division championship in 1983–84.

Jimmy Cowie set two goalscoring records in the 1928–29 season which, as of the date above, still stand; he scored 56 goals in all competitions, and 49 league goals in as many matches in the Midland League. The first player capped at full international level while with the club was Eamon Dunphy when he appeared for the Republic of Ireland against Spain on 10 November 1965. The purchase of Adrian Randall from Burnley on 28 December 1995 represents the club's record transfer fee paid, at £140,000.

Other players took part in significant matches in the history of the club. David Archibald, Jimmy Cowie, Charlie Davis, Sam Evans, Jack Farmery and Bill Gardner appeared in York's first Football League match in 1929. Keith Houchen scored the winning goal with a penalty in a 1–0 win over First Division club Arsenal in the 1984–85 FA Cup. Four men listed here featured in the York team that won in the 2012 Conference Premier play-off Final, those being Jon Challinor, Chris Doig, Jamie Reed and Jason Walker.

As of the date above, no player has left the club with 99 career appearances; four – John Stone, Barry Lyons, Gary Bull and Malcolm Comrie – finished on 98. The list includes 13 players who are still contracted to the club, and so can add to their totals.

Key
The list is ordered first by number of appearances in total, then by number of league appearances, and then if necessary by date of debut.
Appearances as a substitute are included.
Statistics are correct up to and including the match played on 18 March 2023. Where a player left the club permanently after this date, his statistics are updated to his date of leaving.

Players with 25 to 99 appearances

Players with fewer than 25 or 100 or more appearances

Notes

Player statistics include matches played while on loan from:

References
General

Specific

Players
 
York City
York City F.C. Players
Association football player non-biographical articles